The Amargarh Fort is a fort in Amargarh, near Jahazpur in Bhilwara district of Rajasthan, India.

Forts in Rajasthan
Bhilwara district